The 1920–21 Lancashire Cup competition was the thirteenth playing of this regional rugby league competition.  Broughton Rangers beat Leigh in the final at The Willows,  Salford by a score of 6-3. The attendance at the final was 25,000 and receipts £1800. Both set new records at the time, the previous highest attendance was 20,000 in 1911.

Background 
The number of teams entering this year’s competition was increased by 2 from the previous season’s 12 to 14 with the introduction of two junior/amateur clubs Wigan Highfield (who would become members of the league in two years time), and Cumbrian team Askam. This enabled the competition to be run with only 2 byes in the first round.

Competition and results

Round 1  
Involved  6 matches (with two byes) and 14 clubs

Round 2 – quarterfinals

Round 3 – semifinals

Final

Teams and scorers 

Scoring - Try = three (3) points - Goal = two (2) points - Drop goal = two (2) points

The road to success

See also 
1920–21 Northern Rugby Football Union season

Notes 

 1 Askam are a junior (or amateur) team from the neighbourhood of Barrow in Cumbria (originally the Furness district of Lancashire).
 2 Wigan Highfield were at the time a Junior (or amateur) Club. They joined the league in season 1922-23
 3 The Willows was the home ground of Salford

References

RFL Lancashire Cup
Lancashire Cup